La Diligence is a Lucky Luke adventure written by Goscinny and illustrated by Morris. It is the 32nd book in the series and was originally published in French in 1968, and in English by Cinebook in 2010 as The Stagecoach.

Synopsis
Due to an increasing rate of stagecoach holdups, Wells Fargo & Co. decides to organize and conduct a special trip with a load of gold from Denver to San Francisco, with Lucky Luke participating as an escort, to reboost the company's failing public image. Also, the company decides to demonstrate the safety of its transport by ensuring the transport of a cargo of gold between Denver and San Francisco. A large advertising campaign is organized around the event. Some passengers join the trip: a photographer, a professional player, a priest, a couple and a gold digger.

As expected, the stagecoach becomes the target for various hold-up attempts, in addition to an Indian attack, an encounter with the bandit poet Black Bart, various on-board gambling sessions, a traitor - Reverend Rawlins - among the passengers, and (as prescribed by the company) a continuous diet of potatoes and lard (bacon and beans in some earlier translations). In the end the gold not only arrives safely in San Francisco, but the passengers have also gained some new personal insights from that trip.

Characters 

 Hank Bully: Driver of the stage, the 'best whip in the west'.
 Scat Thumbs: Poker player (and cheater).
 Jeremiah Fallings: Photographer.
 Digger Stubble: Gold digger.
 Sinclair Rawlings: (Fake) reverend.
 Annabella and Oliver Flimsy: A couple, with Annabella domineering over her husband (until Oliver makes a fortune gambling).
 Claude Pushpull: Another poker player (and cheater); friend of Scat Thumbs.

Cultural references

 The story was inspired by John Ford's 1939 film, Stagecoach. The poker player in the story, Scat Thumbs, was modelled after actor John Carradine who appeared in the film.
 The character of Hank Bully, the coach driver, is a caricature of actor Wallace Beery. This character resurfaces in volume 54, La Fiancée de Lucky Luke.
 Film director Alfred Hitchcock has a small cameo as a saloon bartender.

External links
Lucky Luke official site album index 
Goscinny website on Lucky Luke

Comics by Morris (cartoonist)
Lucky Luke albums
1968 graphic novels
Works by René Goscinny